Devilbend Natural Features Reserve is a  natural reserve park in the rural locality of Tuerong on the Mornington Peninsula in central southern Victoria, Australia,  southeast of the state capital Melbourne's city center.

These reservoirs were the original reason the surrounding parkland was protected from general public access and was not subjected to land development. Both reservoirs are along the course of the eponymous Devilbend Creek, a left tributary of the much larger Balcombe Creek that drains into Port Phillip Bay at Mount Martha. Nearby just  in the north, there is a much smaller, unnamed third lake further downstream along the creek in the neighboring locality of Moorooduc, next to a golf course within what is known as the Devilbend Recreation Reserve.

History

The nowaday Devilbend Reserve parkland is located within the traditional country of the Bunurong people, part of the indigenous Kulin nation.

The two reservoirs provided backup drinking water to the Mornington Peninsula until the completion of a water pipeline between the Cardinia Reservoir and Pearcedale in December 2000 made them redundant. In September 2006, most of the reservoir land was transferred to Parks Victoria with the Devilbend Natural Features Reserve being gazetted on 8 March 2007. A management plan for the reserve was voted in 2010, and in 2011 a new masterplan aiming to turn the area into a tourist area was prepared.

The Devilbend Foundation was created in 2002 to lobby against recreational fishing in the Devilbend Reserve, and against horseriding in the vicinity, arguing it would compromise the natural equilibrium of the park.

In 2012, after 6 years of land renovation that required a budget $1.6 million, the reserve reopened to the public. The reserve was inaugurated by Peter Walsh, and took the name Devilbend Natural Features Reserve on this day. Among the new features of the park are the entrance gateway, the asphalt entrance road, sealed car park, the picnic and barbecue facilities, the walking tracks and the boardwalk.

Environment

 

Much of the Mornington Peninsula's native bushland has been cleared, and it is estimated that less than 5% of the original habitat remains.  Devilbend is one of just a few sites on the Peninsula containing significant areas of these remnant native vegetation. Over 200 species of indigenous plants have been recorded in and around the reserve, including trees, shrubs, ground plants, aquatics, orchids and their associated communities.  Other sizeable fragments of bushland remaining on the Peninsula are at Point Nepean, Green's Bush and HMAS Cerberus.

Past restrictions on public access to the Devilbend Reserve have created favourable conditions for wildlife, as shown by large numbers of waterbirds and frogs recorded there.  The  Devilbend Reservoir has been identified by BirdLife International as an Important Bird Area (IBA) because it supports, seasonally, over 1% of the global population of the near-threatened blue-billed duck.  The reserve also contains the only nesting site of the white-bellied sea eagle on the Mornington Peninsula.  The growling grass frog and dwarf galaxias have been recorded in the reserve.

44 species of birds were inventoried in the Reserve. In 2005, 140 indigenous plant species were inventoried.

Recreation 

Picnic tables, shelter, public toilets and electric barbecues are available in the Daangean Point Picnic Area. There is no drinking fountain available.

Hiking and cycling 
The features of Devilbend can be explored by selected walking tracks. 
Bittern Reservoir Circuit is accessible off the southern end at Hodgins Road and can be incorporated into the broader circuit.

The trail system includes all‐ability hiking access to the shoreline, viewing/fishing platforms and boardwalk. Cycling is permitted on all trails in the reserve. Dogs and other pets are not permitted.

Horseriding 

Birdwatching 
Birdwatching is popular in the Devilbend Natural Features Reserve, which is of high nature conservation significance, and the Devilbend Reservoir is recognised as an Important Bird Area, meaning an area recognised by BirdLife International as being globally important for the conservation of bird populations. The reserve supports over 1% of the global population of blue-billed duck, which is listed as threatened under the Flora and Fauna Guarantee Act 1988, as well as being the only nesting habitat for the majestic white-bellied sea eagle on the Mornington Peninsula. There have been 158 bird species recorded in the area, including 14 international migratory birds.

Boating 
By the end of 2017, Parks Victoria allowed non-powered paddlecrafts (including canoes, kayaks, paddleboards and windsurfers) on the lake, but only on a  designated boating zone in the northwestern arm of the reservoir, west of a peninsula known as the Daangean Point, with yellow buoys and signs marking the boating zone boundary.

Fishing 
Devilbend and Bittern Reservoirs have game fishes regularly stocked by the Victorian Fisheries Authority, both introduced (such as rainbow trout, brown trout and yellow perch) and native species (such as estuary perch, Australian bass and surf bream), as well as variously naturalized invasive species (such as redfin and carp). Angling is permitted but all adults aged between 18 and 69 require a recreational fishing license and all fishing activities needs to be done in accordance with the Victorian Recreational Fishing Guide. Bank fishing is permitted only in five designated fishing zones in the northern shores of the two reservoirs (four in Devilbend, one in Bittern), and boat fishing only in the non‐powered watercraft zone on Devilbend Reservoir.

Starting in 2010, the Devilbend Reservoir was stocked with 14,000 rainbow trout and 21,000 brown trout. Those first trout stocks were done secretly, and much of the initial fingerlings were eaten by native perches. In November 2017, the Victorian Fisheries Authority released 180 thumping brown trout ( each, grown at the Snobs Creek hatchery) into the Reservoir to "improve the mixed fishery". 100,000 trout were stocked in the Devilbend Reservoir between 2010 and 2017.

See also
 Lakes and reservoirs of Melbourne
 Boon wurrung

References

External links
 Victoria State Government
 Devilbend Foundation

Mornington Peninsula
Important Bird Areas of Victoria (Australia)
Nature reserves in Victoria (Australia)
2007 establishments in Australia
Reservoirs in Victoria (Australia)